Pricol Limited (founded as Premier Instruments and Controls Limited) is an automotive components and precision engineered products manufacturer based in Coimbatore, India. It was founded in 1972 by the late V.N. Ramachandran and N.Damodaran, but started production in 1975. It manufactures automotive components for motorcycles, scooters, cars, trucks, buses, tractors and Off-road vehicles used in the construction and Industrial segment. Pricol also manufacture sintered components and products for fleet management. Vijay Mohan is the chairman, Vikram Mohan is the Managing Director and Vanitha Mohan is the vice chairman.

Locations 
Pricol Limited has six manufacturing plants in India, Plants 1,3 and 4 in Coimbatore, Plant 2 in Manesar and Plant 5 in Pune and Plant 6 in Rudrapur.  The company also has plants in Jakarta (Indonesia) and Sao Paulo (Brazil) and business offices in Tokyo, Singapore, Cologne (Germany) and Detroit (USA).

Pricol also acquiesced a group company PMP of Ashok Piramal group, which has the manufacturing plants in Satara (India), Rudrapur (India), Puebla (Mexico) and in Prague (Czech republic), they bought complete wiper business from PMP.

Operations 
Pricol operates in five business areas:  Driver information systems, Switches actuators and sensors, Powertrain products, Telematics & Infotainment and Fleet management systems.

Products

Driver Information System Products
 Instrument clusters
 Gauges

Power Train Products
 Sintered components
 Oil pumps
 Water pumps
 Chain tensioners 
 Auto fuel cock
 Auto decompression unit
 Fuel feed pump
 Idle speed control valves
 Pressure relief valves

Sensors & Switches
 Speed sensors
 Fuel level sensors
 Selective catalytic reduction
 Map and Tmap sensors
 Oil level switch
 Temperature sensor
 Brake light switch
 Vacuum switch
 Power sockets
 Pressure sensor
 Position sensor

Telematics & Infotainment
 Display & Infotainment
 Body control module
 Telematics products

Fleet Management Systems
 Speed limiter
 Centralized Lubrication Systems
 Vehicle tracking system
 Digital tax fare meter
 Cabin Tilting Systems
 Journey risk management

History 
Key events in Pricol Limited's history

Group Companies 
 Pricol Travel Limited
 Pricol Properties Limited
 Pricol Logistics Private Limited

References

Companies based in Coimbatore
Auto parts suppliers of India
1972 establishments in Tamil Nadu
Indian companies established in 1972
Manufacturing companies established in 1972